Allan M. Armitage (1 June 1946) is professor of horticulture at the University of Georgia, US, where he teaches, conducts research, and runs the University of Georgia Horticulture Gardens—producing annual guidelines for annuals and perennials suitable for heat and humidity.

He is most famously known for his Tilley hat.

Life
Armitage travels widely as a lecturer and consultant and has received numerous awards from nursery trade groups and horticultural organizations, including the Medal of Honor from the Garden Club of America. He was recognized as one of the best teachers in the nation when he received the distinguished National Educator Award from the American Horticultural Society.

He is well known as a writer, speaker and researcher  throughout the world. He holds his B.Sc from MacDonald College, Quebec, M.Sc. from University of Guelph, Ontario and his Ph.D. from Michigan State. His publications include nine books and more than 350 articles and papers.

Armitage has lectured in Canada, the United States, China, Colombia, New Zealand, Australia, and Europe. He has visited research centers and production centers throughout the world and is constantly studying annuals, perennials, cut flowers, and greenhouse crops in various climates. He teaches courses in Greenhouse Production, Greenhouse Crop Management, and Herbaceous plant Identification and Use.

He writes a monthly column for Greenhouse Grower Magazine, a national trade journal, in which he discusses new crops and new trends in floriculture.

Publications 
 Armitage, Allan M. Armitage's Native Plants for North American Gardens. Timber Press: Portland, 2006. .
 Armitage, Allan M. Armitage's Garden Annuals: A Color Encyclopedia. Timber Press: Portland, 2004. .
 Armitage, Allan M., and Judy M. Laushman. Specialty Cut Flowers: The Production of Annuals, Perennials, Bulbs, and Woody Plants for Fresh and Dried Cut Flowers. Second Ed. Timber Press: Portland, 2003. .
 Armitage, Allan M. Armitage's Manual of Annuals, Biennials, and Half-Hardy Perennials. Timber Press: Portland, 2001. .
 Armitage, Allan M. Armitage's Garden Perennials: A Color Encyclopedia. Timber Press: Portland, 2000. .
 Armitage, Allan M. Herbaceous Perennial Plants: A Treatise on Their Identification, Culture, and Garden Attributes. 2nd Edition. Ball Publishing: Batavia, 1998. .

References

External links
Author's website

1946 births
Living people
American botanical writers
American male non-fiction writers
American horticulturists
21st-century American botanists
University of Guelph alumni
Michigan State University alumni
University of Georgia faculty